Dimitris (Δημήτρης) is the Modern Greek form of the older forms Demetrios, Dimitrios (Δημήτριος, usually Latinized as Demetrius) and may refer to:

Dimitris Arvanitis (born 1980), Greek professional football defender who plays for OFI Crete in Greek Super League
Dimitris Avramopoulos (born 1953), Greek politician and diplomat
Dimitris Basis, Greek singer musician
Dimitris Bogdanos (born 1975), Greek professional basketball player
Dimitris Christofias, left-wing Greek Cypriot politician, President of the Republic of Cyprus
Dimitris Diamantidis (born 1980), Greek professional basketball player
Dimitris Dimakopoulos (born 1966), retired Greek professional basketball player
Dimitris Dimitrakos (born 1936), Greek philosopher, currently Professor at the University of Athens
Dimitris Dragatakis (1914–2001), Greek composer of classical music
Dimitris Drosos (born 1966), Greek businessman, ex-chairman of AEK Athens BC, current chairman of PAOK BC
Dimitris Giantsis (born 1988), Greek footballer
Dimitris Giovanakis (born 1986), Greek football player
Dimitris Glinos (1882–1943), Greek philosopher and politician
Dimitris Horn (1921–1998), Greek theatrical and film performer
Dimitris Karademitros, (born 1983), Greek footballer
Dimitris Komesidis (born 1988), professional football defender
Dimitris Kontopoulos (born 1971), Greek music composer known for his dance-pop music
Dimitris Koutromanos (born 1987), Greek football player
Dimitris Koutsoukis (born 1962), retired Greek shot putter
Dimitris Kraniotis (born 1950), Greek dancer and poet who lives in France
Dimitris Kremastinos (1942–2020), Greek politician, cardiologist and professor
Dimitris Kyriakidis (born 1986), Greek footballer
Dimitris Liantinis (born 1942), Greek deputy professor at University of Athens who disappeared
Dimitris Lipertis (1866–1937), Cypriot poet
Dimitris Lignadis, Greek actor, stage director and alleged sex offender
Dimitris Lyacos (born 1966), contemporary Greek poet and playwright
Dimitris Mardas (born 1955), Greek economist
Dimitris Markos (born 1971), retired Greek football midfielder
Dimitris Marmarinos (born 1976), Greek professional basketball player
Dimitris Mavroeidis (born 1985), Greek professional basketball player
Dimitris Mavrogenidis (born 1978), Uzbekistan-born Greek football right-back
Dimitris Melissanidis (born 1946), Greek businessman and Oil tycoon
Dimitris Mitropanos (born 1948), Greek singer in the Laïkó Greek music style
Dimitris Mytaras (born 1934), Greek artist born in Chalkis
Dimitris Nalitzis (born 1976), Greek footballer
Dimitris Nikolaidis (1922–1993), Greek actor
Dimitris Papaditsas (1922–1987), Greek poet
Dimitris Papadopoulos (basketball player) (born 1966), retired Greek professional basketball player
Dimitris Papaioannou (born 1964), Greek avant-garde stage director, choreographer and visual artist
Dimitris Papamichael (1934–2004), famous Greek actor and director
Dimitris Papanikolaou (born 1977), Greek professional basketball player
Dimitris Papanikolau (born 1977), Greek professional basketball player
Dimitris Petkakis (born 1983), football (soccer) player
Dimitris Pikionis (1887–1968), major Greek architect
Dimitris Plapoutas (1786–1865), Greek general who fought during the Greek War of Independence
Dimitris Potiropoulos (born 1953), Greek architect
Dimitris Poulianos (1899–1972), prodigious Greek artist
Dimitris Poulikakos (born 1943), Greek actor and rock singer
Dimitris Psathas, famous modern Greek satirist and playwright
Dimitris Rizos (born 1976), Greek goalkeeper
Dimitris Rontiris (1899–1981), Greek actor and director
Dimitris Roussis (born 1988), professional football defender
Dimitris Salpingidis (born 1981), Greek footballer
Dimitris Samaras, Greek footballer
Dimitris Sgouros (born 1969), Greek pianist
Dimitris Sialmas (born 1986), Greek footballer
Dimitris Sioufas (born 1944), Greek lawyer and New Democracy politician
Dimitris Siovas (born 1988), Greek football player
Dimitris Soudas (born 1979), Associate Communications Director and Spokesman to the Prime Minister of Canada
Dimitris Soulas (born 1938), former Greek photojournalist
Dimitris Spanoulis (born 1979), Greek professional basketball player
Dimitris Spentzopoulos (born 1950), former Greek footballer (striker) born in Patras
Dimitris Thanopoulos (born 1987), football midfielder currently without a team
Dimitris Tsaldaris (born 1980), Greek professional basketball player
Dimitris Tsaloumas (born 1921), contemporary Greek-Australian poet
Dimitris Tsironis (born 1959), Greek footballer
Dimitris Tsironis (politician) (1960–2022), Greek politician
Dimitris Tsovolas, politician of Greece
Dimitris Tziotis, the President and CEO of Cleverbank, a strategy consultancy in Greece
Dimitris Varos (born 1949), modern Greek poet, journalist, and photographer
Dimitris Verginis (born 1987), Greek professional basketball player
Dimitris Vlastellis (born 1982), Greek football player
Dimitris Voyatzis, Greek film director, actor, producer, editor, a screenwriter and a folk musician
Dimitris Yeros (born 1948), one of the most influential Greek artists of his generation
Dimitris Zouliotis (born 1984), Greek football player

See also
List of Dimitris Papaioannou comics
List of Dimitris Papaioannou works

Greek masculine given names